The Wenvoe Arms is a village pub in Wenvoe, in the Vale of Glamorgan, Wales.

Dating back to the late 18th century, the pub has been a focal point of the village for many years, and many committee meetings were held here. The pub was bought by S A Brain sometime in the mid 1980s, which was viewed at the time as the final step in the corporatisation of Wales' small rural communities,  from its days as a tight-knit farming community, through the population explosion in the 1960s to the present day. A malt house was once located behind the pub.

Although the village's population number of a few hundred at the beginning of the 20th century has been vastly augmented, the pub maintains a small and close-knit group of regulars, many of whom have been drinking at the Wenvoe Arms for many years. Every Thursday the pub offers pole dancing and burlesque lessons.

References

External links
Official site

Pubs in the Vale of Glamorgan